The Junior Champion Stakes was a race for two-year-old Thoroughbred horses at Gravesend Race Track in Gravesend, on Coney Island, New York State. The September 18, 1909 edition of the Daily Racing Form stated that for a number of years it had been one of the East Coast's most important and valuable stakes for two-year-olds.

Among the race winners, Mesmerist was chosen the 1899 American Champion Two-Year-Old Male Horse as was Commando (1900), Highball (1903), Sysonby (1904) and Salvidere in 1906.

Demise
In 1908, the administration of Republican Governor Charles Evans Hughes signed into law the Hart–Agnew bill that effectively banned all racetrack wagering in New York State. A 1910 amendment to the legislation added further restrictions that meant by 1911 all racetracks in the state ceased operations. Although the law was repealed in time to resume racing in 1913, the Gravesend Race Track never reopened. 
 
In 1923, a new Junior Champion Stakes, later renamed the Cowdin Stakes, was inaugurated at Aqueduct Racetrack in South Ozone Park neighborhood in Queens, New York City.

Records
Speed record:
 1:09.00 at 6 F ± – Suffragette (1908)
 1:13.80 at 6 F – Commando (1900)

Most wins by a jockey:
 2 – Walter Miller (1906–1907)

Most wins by a trainer:
 4 – James G. Rowe Sr. (1900, 1904, 1907, 1908)

Most wins by an owner:
 3 – James R. Keene (1900, 1904, 1907)

Winners
DRF history of the Junior Champion Stakes, 1898–1908

References

Gravesend Race Track
Open sprint category horse races
Recurring sporting events established in 1898
Recurring sporting events disestablished in 1908
Discontinued horse races in New York City
1898 establishments in New York City
1908 disestablishments in New York (state)